The 2006–07 Women's EHF Cup was the 26th edition of the European Handball Federation's secondary competition for women's handball clubs, running from 14 September 2006 to 20 May 2007. Zvezda Zvenigorod defeated Ikast Bording EH in the final to become the first Russian team to win the competition.

First qualifying round

Second qualifying round

Round of 32

Round of 16

Quarter-finals

Semi-finals

Final

References

Women's EHF Cup
EHF Women's Cup
EHF Women's Cup